Eather may refer to:

Alice Eather (1988/89–2017), Australian poet
Edgar Eather (1886–1968), Justice of the Supreme Court of Nevada
Kenneth Eather (1901–1993), Australian Army officer who served during the Second World War
Michael Eather (born 1963), contemporary Australian artist
Stephen Eather (born 1961), Australian rules footballer
Mount Eather, mountain in Antarctica

See also
Ether
Aether (disambiguation)
Either (disambiguation)